San Cristoforo di Lammari is 12th-century, Romanesque-style, Roman Catholic parish church in Capannori, province of Lucca, region of Tuscany, Italy.

History
The present church at the site was built between the 11th and 12th centuries at the site of an earlier 9th century church,. The ceramic decoration in the apse dates from this latter construction. The layout is that of a Latin cross with three naves, each with a semicircular apse. A bell-tower rises alongsides. A refurbishment occurred in the 16th century, with the insertion of side altars.

References

12th-century Roman Catholic church buildings in Italy
Roman Catholic churches in Tuscany
Romanesque architecture in Tuscany